Route 18, also known as Cape Bear Road, is a , two-lane, uncontrolled-access, secondary highway in eastern Prince Edward Island. Its southern terminus is at Route 4 in High Bank and its northern terminus is at Route 4 in Murray River. The route is entirely in Kings County.

Route description 

The route begins at its southern terminus and goes west to Guernsey Cove, where it turns right and continues northwest. The route turns left and then curves left in Beach Point to head southwest to a right turn in Murray Harbour. The route then goes west to its northern terminus.

Route 18A 

Route 18A, also known as Robertson Road, is the suffixed route of Route 18. The route has no major intersections except for its terminuses with Route 18.

References 

018
018